Estonia competed at the 2011 World Championships in Athletics from 27 August–4 September.

Team selection

A team of 10 athletes was announced in preparation for the competition. Selected athletes have achieved one of the competition's qualifying standards. Javelin thrower Risto Mätas was registered as a reserve athlete.

The following athlete appeared on the preliminary Entry List, but not on the Official Start List of the specific event, resulting in a total number of 9 competitors:

Medalists
The following competitor from Estonia won a medal at the Championships

| width="78%" align="left" valign="top" |

Results

Men

100 metres

200 metres

Decathlon

Discus throw

Javelin throw

Women

400 metres

Heptathlon

High jump

References

External links
Official local organising committee website
Official IAAF competition website

Nations at the 2011 World Championships in Athletics
World Championships in Athletics
2011